is a public elementary school in Ginza, Chuo, Tokyo. It is operated by the Chuo City Board of Education (中央区教育委員会).

Another plaque stated that the façade, which has ivy, is seen as a symbol in Ginza.

The school's attendance boundary includes the following portions of Ginza: All of 5-8 chome, and parts of 1-chome (2-10-ban, and two lots of 11-ban), 2-chome (2-9 ban), 3-chome (2-8 ban), and 4-chome (1-8 ban).

History

The school's year of establishment is 1878.

A new building opened in 1912.

Another new building was established after the Great Kanto Earthquake.

U.S. bombing raids destroyed the school in May 1945. It was rebuilt to closely match the previous building.

By 2016 some new family-style apartments opened in the school's attendance boundary, prompting an increase of students in the attendance zone.

The school requires its students to wear school uniforms. In 2018 the school announced that a new set of optional uniforms would be designed by Armani. They were criticized by parents, Japanese government officials and opinion columnists being relatively expensive, especially as prices of school uniforms in general in Japan increased. The complete set had a cost of over 80,000 yen, more than $730 U.S. dollars. The price for the smallest compulsory set was over 100% more than that of the other uniform.

Student body
In 2016 the school had 334 students, with over 30 of them residing in the attendance boundary.

Operations
The cafeteria uses the same menu used in other Chuo City schools, although for special occasions it sources its broth from the owner of Ginza Kojyu. Area museums and theaters are places visited during field trips.

Notable alumni
 Yukiji Asaoka
 Shinzo Fukuhara
 Mitsuharu Kaneko
 Takeshi Katō
 Tokoku Kitamura
 Fumimaro Konoe
 
 Yoshiko Okada
 Tōson Shimazaki

See also

 Elementary schools in Japan
 List of elementary schools in Tokyo

References

External links

 Taimei Elementary School 

Educational institutions established in 1878
1878 establishments in Japan
Ginza
Buildings and structures in Chūō, Tokyo
Schools in Tokyo
Elementary schools in Japan